Camille Keaton (born July 20, 1947) is an American actress and model. She is best known for her role as Jennifer Hills in the controversial 1978 film I Spit on Your Grave. She began her career in Italy, making her film debut as Solange Beauregard in the giallo film What Have You Done to Solange? (1972), and starred in several other Italian horror films through the early 1970s. In 2015, Keaton reprised her role as Jennifer Hills for the film, I Spit on Your Grave: Deja Vu, which was released in 2019.

Early life
Keaton was born July 20, 1947 in Pine Bluff, Arkansas. She attended middle school in Eudora, Arkansas until 1960 when her family moved to Atlanta, Georgia.

In 1969, she was involved in a major car accident that left her with facial scarring. Keaton once worked as a hostess for Amtrak.

Career
Keaton relocated to Italy in 1971, where she had signed with a talent agent, and appeared in several commercials. Her debut role was in 1972 playing the role of Solange, a missing woman, in Massimo Dallamano's  movie of the giallo genre entitled What Have You Done to Solange? Though a small role, her delicate and fragile physique got immediate attention. Robert Marcucci says of her role as Solange, "She truly steals every scene she's in, simply drifting in and out of each of her scenes, her face and mannerisms mysterious and alluring." The same year, she appeared as the lead in the Italian horror film Tragic Ceremony (1972).

In November 1972, Keaton was a centerfold in the Italian men's entertainment magazine Playmen. In September 1974, she was on the cover of Playmen. Keaton returned to the United States in 1975, settling in New York City. She then appeared as Jennifer Hills, a rape victim who wreaks bloody vengeance on her attackers, in the controversial exploitation film I Spit On Your Grave (1978), directed by her then-husband, Meir Zarchi. For her performance, she won the Medalla Sitges en Plata de Ley (Sitges Sterling Silver Medal) Best Actress award at the 1978 Sitges - Catalan International Film Festival.

After the release of I Spit On Your Grave, Keaton moved with husband Zarchi to Los Angeles, California.

In 2012, Keaton appeared in an uncredited role in Rob Zombie's The Lords of Salem, and has also appeared in the films Chop (2011) and The Butterfly Room (2013).

Her most recent films include Samuel Farmer's home-invasion thriller The Last House (2019), Terror in Woods Creek (2017), Blood River (2013), Plan 9 (2015), and writer/director Jake Zelch's reimagining of Keaton's infamous 1993 film Savage Vengeance (2020).

Personal life
In 1979, Keaton married Israeli filmmaker Meir Zarchi, the director of I Spit on Your Grave; they divorced in 1982. She was married to film producer Sidney Luft from March 20, 1993 until his death on September 15, 2005.

Filmography

Notes

References

Sources

External links

 

1947 births
American film actresses
Actresses from Atlanta
Actresses from Arkansas
Living people
People from Pine Bluff, Arkansas
21st-century American women